James McClure may refer to:

James H. McClure (1939–2006), British crime author and journalist, born in South Africa
James A. McClure (1924–2011), U.S. Senator from Idaho
James McClure (Unionist politician) (1926–2014), Northern Ireland politician
James Focht McClure Jr. (1931–2010), U.S. federal judge
James McClure (table tennis) (1916–2005), American table tennis player
James Howe McClure (1851–1909), Scottish rugby football player
James Warren McClure (1919–2004), newspaper executive and publisher
 Jimmy McClure ( 1920s), soccer player in the United States

See also
James McLure (1951–2011), American playwright